Dohring is a surname. Notable people with the surname include:

Alfred Dohring (1896–1982), Australian politician
Doug Dohring, American businessman
Jason Dohring (born 1982), American actor
Tom Dohring (born 1968), American football player

See also
Döhring, another surname